Sparviero is Italian for Sparrowhawk. It can refer to:

Italian aircraft carrier Sparviero
Operation Sparviero, the Italian Army contribution to ISAF in Kabul, Afghanistan
Pasotti F.9 Sparviero, an Italian four seat low wing touring aircraft
Pro.Mecc Sparviero, an Italian ultralight aircraft
Savoia-Marchetti S.M.79 Sparviero, a three-engined Italian medium bomber
Sparviero class patrol boat